Bush is an unincorporated community in northeastern St. Tammany Parish, Louisiana, United States. Bush is on Louisiana Highway 21 south of Sun connecting to Bogalusa . It is part of the New Orleans–Metairie–Kenner Metropolitan Statistical Area.

Education
St. Tammany Parish Public Schools serves Bush residents.

Fifth Ward Junior High School in unincorporated St. Tammany Parish serves K-8.

Covington High School in Covington serves Bush residents.

The Bush Branch of the St. Tammany Parish Library serves local residents.

References

External links
  Fifth Ward Junior High School

Unincorporated communities in Louisiana
Unincorporated communities in St. Tammany Parish, Louisiana
Unincorporated communities in New Orleans metropolitan area